Kyle Capobianco (born August 8, 1997) is a Canadian professional ice hockey defenceman for the  Winnipeg Jets of the National Hockey League (NHL). He was the 63rd overall selection of the Arizona Coyotes at the 2015 NHL Entry Draft. Capobianco's grandfather, Clare Exelby, is a former CFL player and uncle, Randy Exelby, is a former NHL player.

Playing career

Junior
Capobianco played four seasons of junior hockey with the Sudbury Wolves of the Ontario Hockey League. The Coyotes selected him after his 2014–15 season, wherein he scored 10 goals and 30 assists in 68 games, for a total of 40 points.

Professional
The Coyotes returned Capobianco to junior hockey for both seasons after drafting him, but upon the completion of the 2016–17 OHL season, Capobianco was called up to the AHL in order to play for the Tucson Roadrunners. Capobianco ended up playing four games for the Roadrunners, scoring zero points. The Arizona Coyotes signed Capobianco to a three-year entry-level contract on June 30, 2017.

At the beginning of the 2017–18 season, Capobianco was assigned to the Tucson Roadrunners. On December 4, 2017, Capobianco was recalled to the Arizona Coyotes. On December 7, 2017, he made his NHL debut for the Arizona Coyotes against the Boston Bruins, earning no points and a –1 rating in 13:33 of ice time. He was assigned to the Coyotes AHL affiliate shortly after. His demotion was short lived as Capobianco was recalled back to the NHL on January 1, 2018.

Capobianco was selected for the 2018 AHL All-Star Game as a replacement for San Antonio Rampage defencemen Jordan Schmaltz. As a restricted free agent, Capobianco remained with the Coyotes by agreeing to a two-year, $1.55 million contract extension on October 5, 2020.

As a free agent from the Coyotes, Capobianco was signed to a two-year, $1.525 million contract with the Winnipeg Jets on July 14, 2022.

International play

Capobianco represented Canada at the 2015 U18 World Championships, where he scored 1 goal and 1 assist in 7 games.

Career statistics

Regular season and playoffs

International

References

External links
 

1997 births
Living people
Arizona Coyotes draft picks
Arizona Coyotes players
Canadian ice hockey defencemen
Canadian sportspeople of Italian descent
Ice hockey people from Ontario
Sportspeople from Mississauga
Sudbury Wolves players
Tucson Roadrunners players